Konuma is a Japanese surname. Notable people with the surname include:

, Japanese television personality
, Japanese sumo wrestler
, Japanese film director

Japanese-language surnames